Colleen D. Zahn (born October 7, 1973) is an American lawyer and jurist, currently an associate justice of the Idaho Supreme Court. She assumed office in 2021.

Education 
Zahn earned a Bachelor of Science degree in communications and public relations from the University of Idaho in 1995 and a Juris Doctor from its College of Law in 2000.

Career 
Zahn spent ten years in the private sector with trial and litigation firms. She served as a deputy attorney general in the department of correction and the civil litigation division, and was the chief of the criminal law division for the state attorney general until her judicial appointment.

Idaho Supreme Court 
On June 1, 2021, Governor Brad Little appointed Zahn to serve as an associate justice of the Idaho Supreme Court. Little nominated Zahn for the seat being vacated by Chief Justice Roger Burdick, who had announced his intent to retire on June 30. Zahn was sworn in on July 1, and publicly sworn in on July 14, 2021. She is the fourth female justice to serve on the court, and ran unopposed in 2022, conducted in the state's May primary.

References

External links 
Idaho Supreme Court – Hon. Collen D. Zahn

Living people
Place of birth missing (living people)
20th-century American women lawyers
20th-century American lawyers
21st-century American judges
21st-century American women lawyers
21st-century American lawyers
Idaho lawyers
Justices of the Idaho Supreme Court
University of Idaho alumni
University of Idaho College of Law alumni
1973 births
21st-century American women judges